Thomas G. Raffo is an American college baseball coach and former first baseman. Raffo is the head coach of the Arkansas State Red Wolves baseball team.

Amateur career
Raffo attended Bishop Kenny High School in Jacksonville, Florida. He was named a First Team All-Florida Class AAA. He was drafted in the 34th round of the 1986 Major League Baseball draft by the Baltimore Orioles, but he decided not to sign. Raffo then accepted a scholarship to play at Mississippi State University, to play college baseball for the Mississippi State Bulldogs baseball team.

As a sophomore in 1988, Raffo was named Second Team All-Southeastern Conference (SEC).

As a junior in 1989, Raffo batted .383 with a 22 home runs and 80 RBIs. He was named First Team All-SEC.

As a senior in 1990, he batted .358 with 13 home runs and 69 RBIs. He was again named First Team All-SEC.

Professional career
Raffo was drafted in the 8th round (209th overall) by the Miami Miracle in the 1990 Major League Baseball draft.

Raffo began his professional career with the Miracle of the Class A Florida State League, where he batted .258 with three home runs.

Raffo played 1991 season with the Charleston Wheelers of the Class A South Atlantic League as a member of the Cincinnati Reds organization. He batted .277 with 13 home runs and 68 RBIs in 133 games.

In 1992, he played with the Cedar Rapids Reds of the Midwest League. He batted .302 with nine home runs and 38 RBIs during the season. He signed with the St. Paul Saints to play the 1993 season. He hit just .321 with 20 RBIs in 48 games.

Coaching career
In 1994, Raffo was named a volunteer assistant at Mississippi State. In the fall of 1997, he was promoted to a full-time assistant. In 2008, Raffo was being considered for the head coaching position at Mississippi State, but when the team decided to go with John Cohen, he was named the head coach for the Arkansas State Red Wolves baseball program.

Raffo lead the Red Wolves to their best finish in Sun Belt Conference history going 19–9 finishing 2nd. As a result, he was named the 2012 Sun Belt Coach of the Year.

Head coaching record

See also
 List of current NCAA Division I baseball coaches

References

External links

Arkansas State Red Wolves bio

Living people
1967 births
Baseball first basemen
Mississippi State Bulldogs baseball players
Miami Miracle players
Charleston Wheelers players
Cedar Rapids Reds players
St. Paul Saints players
Mississippi State Bulldogs baseball coaches
Arkansas State Red Wolves baseball coaches
Bishop Kenny High School alumni
People from Orange Park, Florida
Baseball coaches from Florida